Osceola Parkway, signed as County Road 522 (CR 522) since around 2003 (and originally planned as State Road 424), is a , partially tolled arterial road extending east–west across the northern boundary of Osceola County, Florida, roughly paralleling the border with Orange County. It connects Walt Disney World with Interstate 4 and Florida's Turnpike before terminating at Simpson Road (formerly Boggy Creek Road) near Buenaventura Lakes, and is maintained by Osceola County. Only the section between the Southern Connector and a toll plaza east of Shingle Creek is tolled; the rest includes mainly at-grade intersections. A portion of the Osceola Parkway was once called Dart Boulevard.

Route description
The road starts at an intersection with an entrance road to the Disney's Animal Kingdom Lodge in Lake Buena Vista. For its westernmost , it has many characteristics of an at-grade boulevard; however, east of the entrance to Disney's Animal Kingdom, it becomes a grade-separated expressway. Heading east, the parkway passes through several sections of the Disney World Complex before intersecting with World Drive and crossing into Osceola County. The parkway exits Walt Disney World, just before an interchange with I-4. Although Osceola Parkway was built across I-4 into Walt Disney World, an interchange with that freeway (Exit 65) did not open until 2001. The ramps with the exit to nearby SR 536 are interspersed such that traffic going on to I-4 from SR 536 cannot directly exit onto Osceola Parkway, and vice versa. The road then has an interchange with SR 417 (Southern Connector), where the Parkway becomes a limited access toll road (although not a full expressway). The parkway passes through residential areas, passing through an interchange with Poinciana Blvd., featuring ramp tolls of $1.00 for eastbound exiting traffic and westbound entering traffic. East of the interchange, Osceola Parkway crosses the one mainline toll plaza just east of Shingle Creek, with a $2.00 toll as of January 2020.

East of the toll plaza, the tolled section of the parkway ends as it becomes a surface street, as it continues to pass through residential and shopping areas with at grade intersections, most notably with John Young Parkway and US 17/US 92/US 441 (Orange Blossom Trail) as the road heads towards Florida's Turnpike. East of the Turnpike, the road continues as a four lane street through another residential development until its terminus at Simpson Road, near Buenaventura Lakes. Simpson Road was known as Boggy Creek Road until September 2014, which removed the unusual situation of having a three way intersection with all three roads having the same name.

The Parkway originally used an electronic toll collection system known as O-PASS, however the county elected to discontinue its own toll collection program and instead contracted with the Orlando–Orange County Expressway Authority (OOCEA) to provide that service, so the O-PASS system was merged with the E-PASS system. The Osceola Parkway also accepts SunPass accounts which are run by the Florida Department of Transportation and are accepted on most toll roads throughout the State of Florida.

History

The road originally opened as Dart Boulevard on June 16, 1987 as a two-mile stretch between U.S. Highway 441 and Buenaventura Boulevard. During the early 1990s, Disney World and Osceola County officials extended and upgraded the road to its current  parkway form, widened the lanes from two to four and added an interchange with Florida's Turnpike, with the highway opening on August 18, 1995.

The date of substantial completion for the second phase of work on the east-west road is April 1, 2015.

Future
The Osceola County Expressway Authority is planning an easterly extension as part of the Osceola County Beltway System. Following a 2012 feasibility study and a March 2013 public meeting, the project team decided on an alignment along the county line, either leaving the current roadway east of Windy Cove Drive (Bridgewater subdivision) or following the current roadway to its end at Simpson Road and curving northeast there. A spur would extend north to SR 417 near Orlando International Airport.

Major intersections

See also

References

External links

Osceola County Online - Osceola Parkway
Florida @ SouthEastRoads - Osceola Parkway (Osceola County 522)
Osceola Parkway Map
Osceola Parkway Extension Project Development and Environment Study

Parkways in the United States
Toll roads in Florida
Walt Disney World
Roads in Osceola County, Florida
Non-freeway toll roads